The Toadstool Millionaires: A Social History of Patent Medicines in America before Federal Regulation is a book about patent medicines by social historian James Harvey Young.

Bibliography

External links 

 
 Full text, reproduced with permission of the author and publisher

1961 non-fiction books
American history books
English-language books
Books about the history of science
History books about the United States
Princeton University Press books
Patent medicines